Ion Covaci (19 April 1945 – 14 November 1973), also known as Ianos Kovacs or János Kovács, was a Romanian boxer. He competed in the men's light middleweight event at the 1968 Summer Olympics. Covaci also won four national senior titles.

Death
After he ended his boxing career, Covaci became a militia officer in his native city, Brăila. On 14 November 1973 while patrolling in the city, he saw a 23-year-old man named Mihai Ion who he fought seemed suspicious. Covaci asked him to present his ID but Ion refused. Covaci decided to take him to the Miliția station. While walking near a crowded bus station, Ion pulled out a dagger from his jacket and stabbed Covaci's neck with it, killing him. Ion ran away, but was caught two days later in Galați, being sentenced to 25 years in prison.

References

External links
 
 

1945 births
1973 deaths
Romanian male boxers
Olympic boxers of Romania
Boxers at the 1968 Summer Olympics
Sportspeople from Brăila
Light-middleweight boxers
People murdered in Romania
Deaths by stabbing in Romania